The Story of Mankind is a 1957 American dark fantasy film loosely based on the nonfiction book The Story of Mankind (1921) by Hendrik Willem van Loon. The film was directed and coproduced by Irwin Allen and released by Warner Bros.

Plot 
Scientists have developed a weapon called the Super H-bomb that can exterminate the human race. A high tribunal in the Great Court of Outer Space is convened to decide whether divine intervention should be allowed to stop the bomb's detonation. The devil, who goes by the name of Mr. Scratch, prosecutes mankind while the Spirit of Man defends it.

Scratch and the Spirit of Man are allowed to take the tribunal to any period of time to present evidence for mankind's salvation or damnation. They take the tribunal from prehistory through Egyptian, Greco-Roman, Medieval, Renaissance, Enlightenment and modern times, looking at historical figures.

Ultimately the tribunal is asked to rule. The high judge, facing Mr. Scratch and the Spirit with a large assemblage of peoples in their native costumes behind them, declares that the good and evil of mankind are too finely balanced. A decision is suspended until they return. When they return, they expect to see a resolution of humanity's age-old struggle with itself.

Cast 

 Ronald Colman as The Spirit of Man
 Vincent Price as Mr. Scratch
 Hedy Lamarr as Joan of Arc
 Groucho Marx as Peter Minuit
 Harpo Marx as Sir Isaac Newton
 Chico Marx as Monk
 Virginia Mayo as Cleopatra
 Agnes Moorehead as Queen Elizabeth I
 Peter Lorre as Nero
 Charles Coburn as Hippocrates
 Sir Cedric Hardwicke as High Judge
 Cesar Romero as Spanish Envoy
 John Carradine as Khufu
 Dennis Hopper as Napoleon Bonaparte
 Marie Wilson as Marie Antoinette
 Helmut Dantine as Mark Antony
 Edward Everett Horton as Sir Walter Raleigh
 Reginald Gardiner as William Shakespeare
 Marie Windsor as Joséphine de Beauharnais
 George E. Stone as Waiter
 Cathy O'Donnell as Early Christian Woman
 Franklin Pangborn as Marquis de Varennes
 Melville Cooper as Major Domo
 Henry Daniell as Bishop Cauchon
 Francis X. Bushman as Moses
 Jim Ameche as Alexander Graham Bell
 Austin Green  as Abraham Lincoln
 Bobby Watson as Adolf Hitler

Production
The film was former publicist Irwin Allen's first attempt at directing live actors after his documentaries The Sea Around Us and The Animal World. In May 1955, Allen announced he would write, produce and direct a film based on the book, and Warner Bros. agreed to distribute the film. Jack Warner announced that 42 nations would be represented. Allen said securing the rights was "very complicated."

In March 1956, Allen said the film had been in preproduction for a year and that filming would start in June. The original intention was for only two actors to appear in the film, a man and a woman representing mankind through the ages. The film would take over two years to shoot in 18 countries, and Warner Bros. invited several prominent theologians, historians and philosophers to an advisory board for the production. This plan was soon jettisoned. Allen finished a script with Charles Bennett by August 1956.

Casting
Allen wanted an all-star cast to play various people in history. This casting strategy had recently proved very popular in Around the World in 80 Days.

"Where we can't do justice to a time and place we won't just brush them off summarily," said Allen, "We just won't use them. There have been 400 or more giants of history in all our fields. Our big problem has been to bring them down to about 50, asking about each: was what he or she did lasting - and how long did it last? Telling history on the screen can be like telling a bad joke twice. You first have to find a handle, a gimmick."

The first four names cast were Vincent Price, Cedric Hardwicke, Diana Lynn (as Joan of Arc) and Peter Lorre. Next were Ronald Colman, Yvonne de Carlo (as Cleopatra), Charles Coburn and Hedy Lamarr, who replaced Lynn as Joan of Arc. Groucho Marx and Cesar Romero joined. Virginia Mayo would eventually replace de Carlo.

Screenwriter Charles Bennett recalled that Allen paid each of the stars $2,000, though Greer Garson turned down the role of Queen Elizabeth I.

Shooting
Filming started on November 12, 1956. As with Allen's two previous films, The Story of Mankind features vast amounts of stock footage. Battle and action scenes culled from previous Warner Bros. costume films (such as Howard Hawks' 1955 epic Land of the Pharaohs) were coupled with cheaply shot closeups of actors on much smaller sets.

This was the last film to feature the three Marx Brothers, Groucho Marx, Harpo Marx and Chico Marx (and their only film in Technicolor), although they appear in separate scenes and do not act together. Chico became ill and later died on October 11, 1961, this was also the last film of star Ronald Colman and character actor Franklin Pangborn, and the last American film of Hedy Lamarr.

Reception
The Story of Mankind was listed in the 1978 book The Fifty Worst Films of All Time.

Home media
Warner Home Video released the film as part of its Warner Archive made-to-order DVD line on July 20, 2009 in the United States.

Comic book adaptation
 Dell Four Color #851 (January 1958)

See also
 List of American films of 1957
 The Tragedy of Man, a Hungarian play from 1861 with a similar premise

References

External links
 
 
 
 
 Excerpt

1957 films
1950s fantasy films
The Devil in film
Films directed by Irwin Allen
Marx Brothers (film series)
Films produced by Irwin Allen
Depictions of Napoleon on film
Cultural depictions of Joséphine de Beauharnais
Depictions of Nero on film
Cultural depictions of Joan of Arc
Portrayals of Moses in film
Cultural depictions of Isaac Newton
Cultural depictions of Adolf Hitler
Depictions of Julius Caesar on film
Depictions of Abraham Lincoln on film
Cultural depictions of Alexander Graham Bell
Cultural depictions of Christopher Columbus
Cultural depictions of Elizabeth I
Cultural depictions of Marie Antoinette
Cultural depictions of Mark Antony
Cultural depictions of Walter Raleigh
Films adapted into comics
Films scored by Paul Sawtell
Films based on non-fiction books
Films based on children's books
Warner Bros. films
Collage film
American dark fantasy films
1950s English-language films
1950s American films